Pierre-François Percy (28 October 1754 – 18 February 1825) was a French doctor and surgeon.

He was surgeon-in-chief of Napoleon's Grande Armée during the Napoleonic campaigns in Germany and Poland, and present at the Battles of Jena and Friedland.

Biography
Pierre-François Percy, was born on 28 October 1754 in Montagney, Franche-Comté (now in Haute-Saône). His father, Claude Percy, was a surgeon in the village and had previously served as a surgeon in the French army.

The house where Percy was born still features a plaque commemorating his achievements.

Percy died on 18 February 1825 and was buried at Père-Lachaise Cemetery in Paris. He had no children.

Career 
After studying in Besançon, Percy was named surgeon-major of the Berry cavalry regiment in 1782.

During the wars of the French Revolution and Empire, he invented a new kind of ambulance usable on the battlefield known as a "wurst", as well as the cork-balls and the surgical quiver.

He served on the main battlefields of the Empire and became chief surgeon of the Grande Armée, but had to leave the army after 1809 because of ocular problems. His replacement as chief surgeon of the Grande Armée was Nicolas Heurteloup (1750-1812).

He resumed service in 1814 and his conduct earned him the esteem of the Allied armies.

Percy had to retire during the Restoration and died in Paris on 18 February 1825.

Percy was member of the Academy of Sciences, Academy of Medicine, Commander of the Legion of Honor and Baron of the Empire.

Legacy 
Percy's name adorns the Northern pillar of the Arc de Triomphe in Paris.

He is shown in the French painter Antoine-Jean Gros's 1808 painting Napoléon on the Battlefield of Eylau. Percy is presented on the left of the Emperor, signalling to a medical aide who is bandaging a Lithuanian hussar.

Works 
Percy is perhaps best-known for his Journal des Campagnes, which was published in 1904 by the Franc-comtois historian Émile Longin.  The Journal is a regular account of Percy's life on campaign in the Revolutionary and Napoleonic Wars. Some manuscripts were lost in the 79 years between the surgeon's death and the publication of the Journal; however, Percy's writings on the 1806 and 1807 campaigns in Germany and Poland are almost complete. The Journal also includes notes from the 1799 and 1800 campaigns in Helvetia and Germany, the 1805 Austerlitz campaign, and the campaign in Spain (1808-1809).

Percy's Journal describes the often-terrible conditions of army life and military surgery, and the chaos that ensued in the aftermath of major battles.

Sources
Biography of Pierre-François Percy on the Napoleon & Empire website (in English).
Percy's Campaign Journal (in French) on archive.org

1754 births
1825 deaths
First French Empire
19th-century French physicians
18th-century French physicians
Commandeurs of the Légion d'honneur
Members of the French Academy of Sciences
People from Haute-Saône
Burials at Père Lachaise Cemetery
Names inscribed under the Arc de Triomphe